Hard Hitter Tennis, known in Japan as {{nihongo|Magical Sports: Hard Hitter 2|マジカルスポーツ Hard Hitter 2|Majikaru Supōtsu Hādo Hitā Tsū}} and in Europe as Hard Hitter 2, is a tennis video game created by Japanese developer Magical Company Ltd, released in 2002. It's the sequel to the 2001 video game Magical Sports: Hard Hitter (known in Europe as Centre Court: Hard Hitter), which never got a North American release.

Reception 

The game received "mixed" reviews according to the review aggregation website Metacritic. In Japan, Famitsu gave it a score of 26 out of 40.

References

External links 
 

2002 video games
Atlus games
Magical Company games
PlayStation 2 games
PlayStation 2-only games
Tennis video games
Video game sequels
Video games developed in Japan
Multiplayer and single-player video games